Correll Buckhalter (born October 6, 1978) is a former American football running back who played for eight seasons in the National Football League (NFL). After playing college football for Nebraska, he was drafted by the Philadelphia Eagles in the fourth round of the 2001 NFL Draft. He played for the Eagles from 2001 to 2008, with three seasons lost due to injury. He played for the Denver Broncos for two seasons (2009 and 2010).

Early years
Buckhalter attended Collins High School (Collins, Mississippi) and was a letterman in football.  In football, he rushed for 3,024 yards over the last two years of his high school years.  He was selected for the all-state team, and during his junior year when he rushed for 1,302 yards.  During his senior year, he rushed for 1,722 yards and 12 touchdowns. Buckhalter graduated from Collins in 1997.

College career
At the University of Nebraska, Buckhalter played in 46 games and finished ranked eighth in school history for rushing yards (2,522).  He had 11 100+ yard games in college while starting only nine times and scored 27 touchdowns at Nebraska.  He majored in sociology.

Professional career

Philadelphia Eagles

Buckhalter's NFL career was marred by injuries. He missed the 2002 season due to a torn anterior cruciate ligament in his left knee and both the 2004 and 2005 seasons due to a torn patellar tendon in his right knee.

In his rookie season of 2001, Buckhalter showed flashes of the potential the Eagles saw when he was drafted. Sharing the load with Duce Staley, he rushed for 586 yards with 4.5 yards per carry average, breaking Keith Byars team record for rushing yards by a rookie. He scored two touchdowns that season. Unfortunately, that season he was also suspended for a game after he and two teammates were stopped by police and arrested for possession of marijuana. Buckhalter was not charged in the case.

Buckhalter would not return to the field again until the 2003 season. Teaming with Staley and second year Brian Westbrook, he led the team in rushing attempts and rushing touchdowns (eight) gaining 542 yards in the process. Again however, he was suspended by Coach Andy Reid after missing a team meeting.

While still recovering, Buckhalter and Bryan Scott made cameo appearances in the comedy movie, White Men Can't Rap.

The 2006 season marked his first action since the 2003 NFC Championship Game. He played in all 16 games, but started only once. His season totals included 345 rushing yards on 83 carries, 24 receptions, 256 receiving yards and three touchdowns.

After the season, Buckhalter was re-signed by the Eagles for two years.

In 2007, he saw action at running back as well as at kick returner. He had 313 yards rushing and a 21.6 yards per return average.

Denver Broncos

On February 27, 2009, Buckhalter signed a four-year, $10 million contract with the Denver Broncos.  The deal included $1.8 million guaranteed. In 2009, his ninth season in the NFL, Buckhalter achieved career highs in rushing yardage (642), yards per carry (5.4), and receptions (31).

In 2010, Buckhalter played in 15 games as a reserve. He rushed for 147 yards and also caught 28 passes for 240 yards. He scored 4 total touchdowns.

On July 28, 2011, he was released by Denver.

Personal
Buckhalter is a cousin of Tampa Bay Buccaneers cornerback Brandon McDonald. Buckhalter has had to deal with adversity over his career.  His mother died when he was young and his brother Chris, who played on the Eagles practice squad in 1996, is serving a 20-year sentence for manslaughter. In March 2009 prosecutors in a Philadelphia drug dealing case named Buckhalter as a celebrity client of the alleged dealer, Styles N. Beckles. Buckhalter has not been charged with any crime and strongly denied any link to Beckles.

Buckhalter owns a Quarter Horse stallion named 'Absolutely No Doubt,' who was the national high point Performance Halter Stallion of the American Quarter Horse Association in 2008.

Buckhalter was charged with one count of conspiracy to commit wire fraud and health care fraud by the United States Department of Justice on December 12, 2019. He initially pleaded not guilty, but later pleaded guilty to the charge by July 2020. He was sentenced to 10 months in prison and 300 days of house arrest in October 2021.

College statistics

NFL Statistics

Regular season

Postseason

References

1978 births
Living people
American football running backs
Denver Broncos players
Nebraska Cornhuskers football players
Philadelphia Eagles players
People from Collins, Mississippi
Players of American football from Mississippi
African-American players of American football
21st-century African-American sportspeople
20th-century African-American sportspeople
Ed Block Courage Award recipients